Antoine Quarles (born November 10, 1985), better known by his stage name Antoine Von Boozier, is an American actor, columnist, television personality, singer, and former publicist. He is best known for appearances on Kings, Limitless, Katie Couric Show, The Real Housewives of New York City, Broad City, and Mob Wives.

Life and career
Von Boozier was born, raised, and resides in Brooklyn, New York. He attended and graduated from Edward R. Murrow High School majoring in Music and Journalism. He has an identical twin brother named Andre.

Prior to television, Von Boozier was a Background singer on the long running TV program the Jerry Lewis MDA Labor Day Telethon. He has contributed BG vocals for numerous artists including: Hezekiah Walker, Lil' Mo, En Vogue, and Cissy Houston. Von Boozier is the co-producer of "Inspired In New York Honors", a monthly series created to honor icons in film, sports, music, fashion, arts, and philanthropy. He is the co-creator of a luxury candle collection named Von Boozier - Signature Lux Candle Collection.  In October 2015, Von Boozier joined the contributing editor staff at Floss Magazine with a column called "Von Boozier Lifestyle".

Filmography
Television
 2007, 2008, 2009 Jerry Lewis MDA Labor Day Telethon as himself (Background Singer)
 2007 Without a Trace as Carson
 2007 Judge David Young as Himself
 2008 CSI: NY as BG
 2008 Lipstick Jungle as BG
 2009 Kings as Shiloh Police Officer
 2009 Castle as Series Regular
 2009 Cupid as Series Regular
 2009 The Good Wife as Mug Shot Criminal
 2009 Law & Order SVU as Series Regular
 2010 Ugly Betty as Series Regular
 2010 You Don't Know Jack as Guest Star
 2011 The Real Housewives of New Jersey as himself
 2012 Ice Loves Coco as herself
 2013 Katie as himself (Panelist)
 2013 Mob Wives as Himself
 2013 King On 34th  as Himself (Fashion Judge)
 2014 Bethenny as Himself
 2014  Broad City as Himself
 2014, 2015, 2016 The Real Housewives of New York City as Himself
 2016  Limitless as Himself (Twin)

Film
 2010 Salt as Navy P.O Officer
 2009 Everybody's Fine as Train Operator
 2009 The Rebound as Boxing Match Judge
 2009 Made for Each Other

References

External links
 Official Website
 

1985 births
Living people
American columnists
American male actors
American publicists
Television personalities from New York City
21st-century American male singers
21st-century American singers
Edward R. Murrow High School alumni